Elmalı is a town and district in Antalya Province, the Mediterranean region of Turkey. In 2007, the population for the whole district was 36.213, of which 14,038 live in the town of Elmalı.

Formerly known as Kabalı and Emelas.

Geography
Elmalı is a small plateau at the head of a long upland valley in the Beydağları range of the western Taurus Mountains, surrounded by high peaks including the 2500m Elmalı Mountain. Aside from the town of Elmalı, the district includes two other small towns (Akçay and Yuva) as well as villages. The area is watered by streams running off the mountains. Although close to the Mediterranean, Elmalı is high in the mountains and has an inland climate of cold winters and hot summers, (although still much cooler than the coast). Near to Lake Avlan there is an area of cedar forest, rare in Turkey.

Villages

History
Excavations, by Machteld Mellink from Bryn Mawr College, of the burial mounds of Semahöyük and Müren have shown signs of copper production dating back to 2500 BC. The area was later a key town in the north of the antique province of Lycia, and the Lycian Way trade route came through here. It was a small town of Asia Minor in the vilayet of Konia in the Ottoman era, then the administrative centre of the ancient Lycia, but not itself corresponding to any known ancient city.
The plain was subsequently controlled by the Ancient Romans, Byzantines, and the Seljuk Turks. The town was the headquarters of Beylik of Teke clan of Anatolian beyliks when it was brought into the Ottoman Empire at the time of Sultan Bayezid I. It remained a key mountain stronghold in the Ottoman period and through the early years of the Turkish republic, but has declined as recent generations have left the dry mountainside for jobs on the coast or in Turkey's major cities.

The district was home to a significant number of Greeks and Armenians until the Population exchange between Greece and Turkey in 1924.

Demographics

According to 2010 census the town has 14.636 and its villages have 23.120 inhabitants. In 2000 the population of the town was 14.600 and the villages had 25.440 inhabitants.

Elmalı has 2 municipalities (Akçay and Yuva) and 49 villages.

The population of inhabited places is as follows according to 2007 census (Municipalities are shown in bold)

Elections

2007 General Elections (Parties with more than %5)

Elmalı today
The district's economy is largely agricultural; 37% of the land is planted. In keeping with its name, (literally apple-town) Elmalı produces 12% of the Turkey's apples. Other fruit and vegetables are grown here too, the local leblebi (dried chick peas) is delicious.

Few tourists come to Elmalı although the town is beginning to attract visitors thanks to its rich traditional architecture and beautiful mountain surroundings; these people are either day-trippers or passing through en route to the Mediterranean coast, but do bring important income to the area. Also some residents of the coastal towns such as Finike, Fethiye or Kaş have holiday homes in Elmalı, a retreat from the summer heat on the coast. There is little industry or manufacturing in the district, only a brickworks, flour and feed mills, and a fruit juice plant.

Most people live in cottages and wooden houses, but there are some apartment buildings in Elmalı itself, a small town of 14,500 people with banks and other essential services. The infrastructure in the villages is basically little more than telephones, and elementary schools. Each village used to have a traditional guest house (köy evi) but many are in disrepair today.

The cuisine is typical of Anatolia, where ladies grilling the flat bread gözleme by the roadside, but Elmalı is known for its various ways of using sesame, including baked beans served with a lemon and sesame relish (Antalya usulu piyaz). Another local speciality is goat milk ice-cream.

Places of interest
There are a number of mosques, prayer schools and other buildings from the Beylik of Teke and the Ottoman periods. Of particular interest are the library containing a collection of Ottoman writings and the mosque and medrese (prayer school) of Ömer Paşa, (1602), student of the great Ottoman architect, Mimar Sinan. There is an earlier, Seljuk period minaret opposite the mosque. Other Ottoman buildings include the tombs of Abdül Vehhat and Abdal Musa; the mosque of Sinan-i Ümmi; the Turkish bath, Bey Hamamı; the fountain of Çatalçeşme, (in the centre, behind the broken minaret).
Recent excavation has revealed a great number of tombs and relics from antique Lycia, and even earlier.
 The Lycian castle of Gilevgi, between the villages of Gilevgi and Çobanisa.

There are of course many places for picnics in the forest and there is an oil wrestling tournament in the first week of September.

Elmalı Treasures
(Elmalı Hazinesi) is the name commonly given in Turkey to an important find of antique treasure; 1,900 silver coins (including 1,100 from Lycia and 14 extremely rare decadrachms) from the Delian League. They were discovered during an illegal excavation in 1984 in Bayındır village, Elmalı and smuggled to the U.S. and European countries. The hoard was reassembled by William Koch with the advice of the numismatists Jeffry Spier and Jonathan Kagan, and a symposium was held to publish and exploit the information gained. The efforts of the journalist Özgen Acar and the Turkish government made the headlines in late 1990s and led to the return of the reassembled hoard. Today, the coins are on exhibit in Elmalı Museum.

Well-known residents
Elmalılı Hamdi Yazır (1877–1942) Muslim cleric whose Turkish language Koran is accepted as a standard translation. He was born in Elmalı (although his family descended from Yazır Turkmens of Burdur). He represented Antalya in the parliament of the Second Constitutional Era (Ottoman Empire) in 1906 and later wrote on religious matters for the government of the Turkish Republic, on behalf of Atatürk himself.
 Abdal Musa, a well-known sufi preacher, a relative of Hacı Bektash Veli. There is a festival to commemorate him held every June in the village of Tekke, where he is buried.

External links
 Prefecture of Elmalı (also in English)
 Elmalı news

References

Towns in Turkey
Antalya
Populated places in Antalya Province
Districts of Antalya Province
Populated places in ancient Lycia